"Amarillo Sky" is a song written by Big Kenny and John Rich (of Big & Rich), along with Rodney Clawson and Bart Pursley. It was originally recorded by Rich for his album Rescue Me in 2001.  McBride & the Ride also recorded a version and released it as a single in 2002 from their album of the same name. Country music artist Jason Aldean later covered the song for his 2005 self-titled debut album, and his version was released as its third single in June 2006. It earned Aldean two nominations at the 2006 Academy of Country Music Awards for Video of the Year and Song of the Year, as well as video with the best direction at the CMT Music Awards.

McBride & the Ride version 
In 2002, McBride & the Ride recorded a version of the song for their Comeback album of the same name and released it as a single.

Content
The song tells the story of a farmer who works on his family's farm near Amarillo, Texas, where co-writer John Rich is from. The farmer is enduring one of the droughts that plague the Panhandle of Texas, where co-writer Rodney Clawson grew up (as a native of Gruver, Texas). The song mentions the various hardships that the farm has faced, such as a damaging hailstorm in 1983 and an increase in the price of diesel fuel. In the chorus, the farmer prays to God that the farm will remain viable ("He says 'Lord, I never complain, I never ask why / Please don't let my dreams run dry / Underneath, underneath this Amarillo sky.'").

Jason Aldean version 
In 2005, Country music artist Jason Aldean covered the song for his Self-titled debut album and his version was released as its third single in June 2006. 

It earned Aldean two nominations at the 2006 Academy of Country Music Awards for Video of the Year and Song of The Year as well as video with the best direction at the CMT Music Awards.

Music video 
The music video was directed by Wes Edwards. It features Jason Aldean and his band playing the song under an old, torn-up barn. It shows young farmers from central Illinois who help take care of their farm. At the beginning of the video (which was cut from the video at times), the young farmers tell their stories of how they grew up on their farms, and how much their farms meant to them. The video premiered on CMT's Top 20 Countdown on the week of 17 August 2006.

Chart performance 
"Amarillo Sky" debuted at number 52 on the U.S. Billboard Hot Country Songs for the week of July 15, 2006.

Year-end charts

Certifications

References

2002 singles
2006 singles
Country ballads
2000s ballads
John Rich songs
McBride & the Ride songs
Jason Aldean songs
Music videos directed by Wes Edwards
Songs written by John Rich
Songs written by Big Kenny
Songs written by Rodney Clawson
Songs about Texas
BBR Music Group singles
Song recordings produced by Michael Knox (record producer)
2001 songs